Darmian County is in South Khorasan province, Iran. The capital of the county is the city of Asadiyeh. At the 2006 census, the county's population was 51,793 in 12,893 households. The following census in 2011 counted 55,080 people in 14,433 households. At the 2016 census, the county's population was 53,714 in 14,639 households.

Administrative divisions

The population history and structural changes of Darmian County's administrative divisions over three consecutive censuses are shown in the following table. The latest census shows three districts, six rural districts, and four cities.

References

 

Counties of South Khorasan Province